Ndola Central is a constituency of the National Assembly of Zambia. It covers central parts of Ndola and a rural area to the east of the city in Ndola District of Copperbelt Province.

List of MPs

Election results

2021 general elections

2008 by-election

References

Constituencies of the National Assembly of Zambia
Ndola
1929 establishments in Northern Rhodesia
Constituencies established in 1929